Nguyễn Ðình Lê (born 9 May 1949) is a Vietnamese former swimmer. He competed in the men's 100 metre freestyle at the 1964 Summer Olympics.

References

1949 births
Living people
Vietnamese male swimmers
Olympic swimmers of Vietnam
Swimmers at the 1964 Summer Olympics
Place of birth missing (living people)